Rao Godji I was the Rao of Cutch belonging to the Jadeja Rajput dynasty, who ruled Princely State of Cutch from 1715 to 1718.

Life
Godji I was a son of Rao Pragmalji I. He led a force sent by his father to restore throne of Tamachi, the sixth in descent from their ancestor Hala, who was driven from Halar. After the death of Pragmalji, he succeeded in 1715 and ruled for a short period of three years. He deposed Haloji, the son of Pragmalji's elder brother Nagulji, of his estate of Mundra. Haloji, unable to resist, retired to Abdasa, and there founded the towns of Kothara, Kotri, and Nagarchi. His descendants are known as Halani Jadejas. He died in 1718 and was succeeded by his son Deshalji I.

Political office

References

Bibliography
 

 This article incorporates text from a publication now in the public domain: 
1718 deaths
Maharajas of Kutch
Hindu monarchs
Gujarati people